Microlepidogaster bourguyi is a species of armored catfish endemic in Brazil.

References

Otothyrinae
Catfish of South America
Fish of Brazil
Endemic fauna of Brazil
Taxa named by Alípio de Miranda-Ribeiro
Fish described in 1911